Dominique Browning is an American writer and editor. From 1995 to 2007 she was the editor-in-chief of the Conde Nast shelter publication House & Garden. Prior to House & Garden she worked at Savvy, American Photographer, Esquire, Newsweek, and Mirabella. As the editor-in-chief of the re-launched House & Garden, she introduced global environment issues to the magazine's pages, and sought to search for the more meaningful ideals behind the consumerism of Condé Nast publications typical of the time, while the editorials of the issues she edited were, for her:

A way of trying to tell readers that even though we were showing perfect rooms and perfect gardens, life is not perfect. And things happen, crazy things, bad things, sad thing, wonderful things happen in those rooms. And that the point of all this nesting and decorating is life. And living a good of life as we possibly can. And I also wanted to remind people why this mattered. That design is not an airhead subject, that it's an important subject, and that making a house and a garden is a pretty profound activity. So, at least in the column it was a way to speak directly to the readers about these issues ... I was always trying to search for, How do we add another dimension to this very materialistic effort of making a house and a garden?

Browning graduated from Wesleyan University in 1977 with a major in philosophy, literature, and history, and is a classically trained pianist. She is the founder of Moms Clean Air Force, an environmental protection organization dedicated to improving air quality standards, maintains a personal blog called 'Slow Love Life', and her writing is regularly featured in The New York Times and Time. She currently contributes to multiple newspapers and magazines, and has a monthly column on the website of the Environmental Defense Fund.

Writing
Browning has authored the following books:
Around the House and In the Garden: a Memoir of Heartbreak, Healing, and Home Improvement
Paths of Desire: the Passion of a Suburban Gardener
Slow Love: How I Lost my Job, Put on My Pajamas, and Found Happiness (released May 9, 2010)
Browning's books deal with her personal life. She was married to Nicholas Lemann, with whom she has two sons, Alexander and Theodore. Her most recent book, Slow Love, recounts her post-divorce relationship with "Stroller", the pseudonym of the legally separated man with whom she had a seven-year relationship, and who repeatedly asked her why it mattered that he was married.

Browning has also written books under the House & Garden brand: 
The House & Garden Book of Style
The Well-Lived Life
Gardens of Paradise 
House of Worship

References

External links
 
 Dominique Browning's Blog
 Excerpt from Slow Love
 Moms Clean Air Force

American magazine editors
Women magazine editors
Living people
Wesleyan University alumni
Year of birth missing (living people)